Al-Shuna   was a Palestinian Arab village in the Safad Subdistrict. It was ethnically cleansed and depopulated during the 1947–1948 Civil War in Mandatory Palestine on April 30, 1948, by the Palmach's First Battalion of Operation Yiftach. It was located 6 km south of Safad, overlooking the deep gorge of Wadi al-'Amud.

History
Victor Guérin describes this place in 1875 as "built of white limestone mixed with stones of black basalt   in alternate courses. We think that although this custom is common in modern Arab building, it can be shown to have been an ancient usage, so that the building may be old. Round it are the vestiges of a ruined hamlet."

In 1881  the PEF's Survey of Western Palestine found at Kŭlảt esh Shûneh:  "A modern Arab building of basaltic stone; used probably as a barn, as the name implies."

British Mandate era
In the 1922 census of Palestine  Shuneh  had a population of 83; all Muslim,  increasing in the 1931 census to  337, still all  Muslims,  in  a total of 65 houses.

In the 1945 statistics the population was  170 Muslims,  with a total of 3,660 dunams of land, according to an official land and population survey. Of this, 995 dunums were used for  cereals,  while  2,481 dunams was non-cultivable area.

The village had a school and a mosque.

1948, aftermath
Today, a wildlife sanctuary known as the Nachal 'Amud Reserve is located in the vicinity.

References

Bibliography

External links
 Welcome To al-Shuna
al-Shuna, Zochrot
 al-Shuna, Villages of Palestine
Survey of Western Palestine, Map 6: IAA, Wikimedia commons

Arab villages depopulated during the 1948 Arab–Israeli War
District of Safad